Cup of Coffee or A Cup of Coffee may refer to:

 A cup of coffee
 A coffee cup, the container itself
 A "cup of coffee", a sports idiom for a short time spent by a minor league player at the major league level
 "Cup of Coffee", a song by Garbage from the 2001 album Beautiful Garbage
 A Cup of Coffee, a 1931 Preston Sturges play
 "A Cup of Coffee", a song by Katy Perry from the 2008 album One of the Boys